"Behind the sofa" is a British pop culture phrase describing the fearful reaction of hiding behind a sofa to avoid seeing frightening parts of a television programme, the sofa offering a place to hide from the on-screen threat, with the implication that one wants to remain in the room to watch the rest of the programme. The phrase is most commonly associated with Doctor Who. Although the phrase is sometimes employed in a serious context, its use is usually intended to be humorous or nostalgic.

Origin in Doctor Who
The expression originated from popular media commentary on young children being frightened by episodes of the BBC science-fiction television series Doctor Who, particularly during the 1960s to the 1980s. The idea that young children would hide behind furniture when especially frightening scenes and monsters were being shown, as they were unwilling to miss the programme altogether, was also popularised in the media as early as 1973. The phrase is strongly associated with Doctor Who in the United Kingdom, so much so that in 1991 the Museum of the Moving Image in London named its exhibition celebrating the programme "Behind the Sofa".

"Everyone remembers hiding behind the sofa," journalist Sinclair McKay wrote of the programme during its thirtieth anniversary year of 1993. "Remember hiding behind the sofa every time Doctor Who came on the television?" the Daily Mirror newspaper asked its readers in a feature article two years later.  In a 2006 interview with Sky News, Prince Andrew, Duke of York said that he hid from Daleks behind a Windsor Castle settee while watching Doctor Who as a child. The Economist has presented "hiding behind the sofa whenever the Daleks appear" as a British cultural institution on a par with Bovril and tea-time; furthermore, it appeared (without any explanation of the idiom) in BBC reportage of the 2016 Donald Trump presidential campaign.

Paul Parsons, author of The Science of Doctor Who, explains the appeal of hiding behind the sofa as the activation of the fear response in the amygdala in conjunction with reassurances of safety from the brain's frontal lobe.

A feature in the Doctor Who Collection Blu-Rays is called Behind the Sofa, featuring actors and other people related to Doctor Who, watching and discussing Classic Series episodes.

In other popular culture
Despite the phrase being so closely associated with Doctor Who, it has also found more general usage in the UK as a humorous or satirical metaphor for being in a state of fear or terror. For example, after he was sacked as the presenter of the comedy programme Have I Got News for You in 2002 due to revelations about his private life, Angus Deayton released a press statement which concluded: "I sincerely wish the show well in the future and look forward to watching this Friday's episode – from behind the sofa." Another example comes from sports coverage; in a live text commentary on a cricket match in the 2005 Ashes series for the Guardian Unlimited website, journalist Rob Smyth wrote of one moment during the game: "Now that Warne's gone, it's safe for Gilo to come out from behind the sofa: his second ball is chipped tantalisingly over the blundering Hoggard at mid-off by Gillespie."

In scripted programming, a reference occurred in a 2001 episode of the BBC sitcom Coupling, where the central character Steve, while extolling the virtues of a sofa, remarks on its usefulness in avoiding Daleks. Coupling writer Steven Moffat went on to write for and then become executive producer of the revived series of Doctor Who.

References

External links
 Behind the Sofa. The Collaborative Doctor Who Blog
 Behind the Sofa. DVD and Blu-ray review show from Cult TV and Edge Media Television

British culture
Doctor Who concepts